San Quintín is a municipality in the Mexican state of Baja California. Its municipal seat is located in the city of San Quintín, Baja California. According to the 2020 census, it had a population of 117,568 inhabitants. The municipality has an area of 32,883.93 km2 (12,696.55 sq mi).  There are a few National Parks and a World Heritage Site at Bahia de Los Angeles.

History 
On 27 February 2020  San Quintin separated from the municipality of Ensenada, and became Baja California's sixth municipality.

Administrative divisions 

The municipality is divided into 8 delegations: 

 Camalú
 Vicente Guerrero
 San Quintín
 El Rosario
 El Marmol
 Punta Prieta
 Bahía de los Ángeles
 Villa Jesús María.

Localities 
The municipality is made up of many localities. Its urban localities in 2010 were:

 Lázaro Cárdenas (16,294)
 Vicente Guerrero (11,455)
 Camalú (8,621)
 Emiliano Zapata (5,756)
 San Quintín (4,777)
 Colonia Lomas de San Ramón (Triquis) (3,805)
 Ejido Papalote (3,413)
 Colonia Nueva Era (3,256)
 Colonia Santa Fe (2,632)

References

 
Populated places in Baja California
Municipalities of Baja California